Knife and Packer are Duncan McCoshan and Jem Packer,  best known as illustrators/writers of children's books and cartoonists.

McCoshan  and Packer first began working together in 1993 on various cartoons and cartoon strips for UK newspapers and magazines, including The Guardian and The Sunday Times.  The It's Grim Up North London cartoon strip, satirising the growth of 'Islington trendies', was one of their first collaborative works and has been running in Private Eye magazine since 1999.

Their first children's book was published in 2001 and they have since produced over 30 books, based on characters Zac Zoltan, Captain Fact, Freak Street and Fleabag Monkeyface.

In 2010 they were commissioned by CiTV to develop their Fleabag Monkeyface series for television, acting as key creatives in storyline and character design. They were also lead scriptwriters. The series was transmitted on ITV in Autumn 2011.

Fleabag Monkeyface series (Walker Books)
 When Earwax Attacks
 King Pong
 The Creature from the Pink Lagoon
 Invasion of the Grubby Snatchers		
 Moldfinger
 The Temple of Baboon

Freak Street series (Scholastic, Australia)
 Meet The Aliensons
 Meet The Zombiesons
 Meet The Humansons
 Meet The Wizardsons
 Meet The Supersons
 Meet The Vampiresons
 Aliensons On Holiday
 Zombiesons On Holiday
 Humansons On Holiday
 Wizardsons on Holiday
 Aliensons Time Machine
 Zombiesons Time Machine
 Humansons Time Machine
 Wizardsons Time Machine

Captain Fact series (Egmont)
 Captain Fact's Space Adventure
 Captain Fact's Creepy-Crawly Adventure
 Captain Fact's Dinosaur Adventure
 Captain Fact's Egyptian Adventure
 Captain Fact's Human Body Adventure
 Captain Fact's Roman Adventure

Zac Zoltan series
 Return of The Chocoholic Vampires
 Hypno-Dwarves and the Night of the Living Bed

Cartoon strips
 I Wish I'd Said That  -  BBC History Magazine
 It's Grim Up North London  -  Private Eye
 Preposterous Properties  -  The Times
 Perfect Couple  -  The Sunday Times
 Office Alien  -  The Guardian
 Bon Viveur   - The Oldie
 Anne Finally  -  New Statesman
 Curator's Egg   - Museums Journal

References

External links 
 Knife and Packer official website (http://www.knifeandpacker.com/)
 Freak Street website (http://www.freakstreet.com/au"www.freakstreet.com.au/)

British cartoonists
British children's book illustrators